Katherine Anne "Kitty" Pryde is a superhero appearing in American comic books published by Marvel Comics, commonly in association with the X-Men. The character first appeared in The Uncanny X-Men #129 (January 1980) and was co-created by writer-artist John Byrne and writer Chris Claremont. A mutant, Pryde possesses a "phasing" ability that allows her to become intangible. This power also disrupts any electrical field she passes through, and lets her simulate levitation.

The youngest to join the X-Men, she was first portrayed as a "kid sister" to many older members of the group, filling the role of literary foil to the more established characters. She occasionally used the codenames Sprite and Ariel, cycling through several uniforms until settling for her trademark black-and-gold costume. During the miniseries Kitty Pryde and Wolverine, she was renamed Shadowcat, the alias she would be most associated with, and shifted to a more mature depiction in her subsequent appearances. Pryde would eventually abandon her nickname, "Kitty", and switch to "Kate". She was one of the main cast of characters depicted in the original Excalibur title. After momentarily joining the Guardians of the Galaxy, she assumed her then-fiancé's superhero identity as the Star-Lord (Star-Lady). As of the series Marauders, she is now informally known as Captain Kate Pryde and the Red Queen of the Hellfire Trading Company.

Kitty Pryde has been described as one of Marvel's most notable and powerful female heroes.

In the 20th Century Fox X-Men film series, Kitty Pryde was initially portrayed by young actresses in cameos; Sumela Kay in X-Men (2000) and Katie Stuart in X2 (2003). Later, Elliot Page portrayed the character in X-Men: The Last Stand (2006) and X-Men: Days of Future Past (2014) in full-length appearances. Pryde is ranked No. 47 in IGN's Top 100 Comic Book Heroes.

Publication history
Kitty Pryde was introduced into the X-Men title as the result of a Marvel Comics editorial dictate that the series depict a school for mutant children. The Uncanny X-Men artist John Byrne named Kitty Pryde after a classmate he met in art school (Canada's Alberta College of Art and Design) in 1973. Byrne had told Pryde he liked her name and asked her permission to use it, promising to name his first original comics character after her. Byrne drew the character to slightly resemble an adolescent Sigourney Weaver.

The fictional Kitty Pryde first appeared in The Uncanny X-Men #129 (January 1980), by writer Chris Claremont and artist Byrne, as a highly intelligent 13-year-old girl. Claremont said several elements of the character's personality were derived from those of X-Men editor Louise Simonson's daughter, Julie. Claremont and Byrne made the new character a full-fledged X-Man in issue #139, where she was codenamed "Sprite". She was the main character in issues #141–142, the "Days of Future Past" storyline, where she is possessed by the consciousness of her older self, "Kate", who time travels from a dystopian future back to the present to get the X-Men to help her prevent an eventual mass extermination of mutants. The six-issue miniseries Kitty Pryde and Wolverine (1984–1985), written by Claremont, is a coming-of-age storyline in which she matures from a girl to a young woman, adopting the new name "Shadowcat".

In the late 1980s, Kitty joined the British-based super team, Excalibur, where she remained for roughly ten years before coming back to the X-Men. In the early 2000s, she disappeared from the spotlight after semi-retiring from superhero work. She was featured in the 2002 mini-series Mekanix and came back to the main X-Men books in 2004 under the pen of Joss Whedon in Astonishing X-Men. She remained a part of the X-Men books until 2008 when she left again for roughly 2 years. After coming back, she was featured in Jason Aaron's Wolverine and the X-Men and Brian Michael Bendis' All-New X-Men books.

In early 2015, she joined the Guardians of the Galaxy. After the Secret Wars event, she adopted her new alias, Star-Lord (first believed to be Star-Lady).

In 2020, Kitty Pryde was revealed to be bisexual. Her co-creator, Chris Claremont, had always intended this to be the case, considering Rachel Summers as a possible love interest for Pryde. However, Claremont wasn't allowed to show this at the time due to censorship, as he revealed on the "Xplain the X-Men" podcast in 2016.

Shadowcat's popularity had a profound effect on the real-life Kitty Pryde: the latter became so overwhelmed by attention from Shadowcat fans, she abbreviated her name to K.D. Pryde to avoid association with her fictional counterpart. She has since stated she has mixed feelings about her fame, saying she values Byrne's comics for their entertainment and artistic value, but wishes more people would appreciate her as more than just Shadowcat's namesake.

Fictional character biography

Katherine Anne "Kitty" Pryde was born in Deerfield, Illinois, to Carmen and Theresa Pryde. She is an Ashkenazi Jewish-American and her paternal grandfather, Samuel Prydeman, was held in a Nazi concentration camp during World War II. Kitty started to have headaches at age thirteen, signaling the emergence of her mutant powers. She was approached by both the X-Men's Charles Xavier and the Hellfire Club's White Queen, Emma Frost, both of whom hoped to recruit her for their respective causes. Kitty was unnerved by Frost, observing that the White Queen looked at her as if she were "something good to eat." She got along better with Xavier and the three X-Men who escorted him, quickly becoming friends with Ororo Munroe. Ororo told Kitty who she really was and about the X-Men, which made the teenager even more enthusiastic about attending Xavier's school.

Their conversation was cut short when they (along with Wolverine and Colossus) were attacked by armored mercenaries in the employ of Frost and the Hellfire Club. The X-Men defeated their assailants, but were subdued by the White Queen's telepathic powers immediately after. In the confusion, Kitty was separated from the X-Men, and not captured along with them. She managed to contact Cyclops, Phoenix, and Nightcrawler. With the help of Dazzler and Pryde, those X-Men rescued their teammates from the Hellfire Club.

The White Queen appeared to perish in the battle, which meant she was no longer competing with Xavier for the approval of Kitty's parents. Kitty's parents had not heard from her in more than a day, because during that time she was first being pursued by the Hellfire Club's men and then working with the X-Men to save their friends. All they knew was Kitty had left with Xavier's "students" to get a soda, there had been reports that the soda shop had been blown up, and Kitty had been missing since. Therefore, they were angry at Xavier when he finally returned with Kitty in tow. At first, it seemed like there was no chance of Kitty being allowed to attend the school and join the X-Men. Phoenix then used her considerable telepathic power to erase the memories of Kitty's parents and plant false ones, resulting in a complete shift in their attitude towards Xavier. Kitty was then allowed to enroll at Xavier's school with her parents' blessing, becoming the youngest member of the team.

Joining the X-Men
Kitty joined the X-Men, and assumed the costumed identity of Sprite. Early in her career as an X-Man, Kitty's adult self from an alternate future took possession of her body in the present to help X-Men thwart the assassination of Senator Robert Kelly by the second Brotherhood of Evil Mutants. Kitty then singlehandedly defeated a N'Garai demon. Kitty also briefly attended the White Queen's Massachusetts Academy when her parents became convinced that she needed to be with students of her own age, but following a failed attempt to subdue the X-Men, Frost revoked Kitty's admission.

During her teen years, Kitty fostered a number of close relationships with others at the school and in the X-Men. She developed a crush on Colossus and became close friends with his little sister Illyana Rasputin. Initially uneasy around Nightcrawler and other mutants with physical deformities, Kitty finally overcame her fears and became close friends with him. Kitty also befriended Lockheed, a highly intelligent alien resembling a dragon, who followed her home after a mission in outer space. Lockheed is extremely loyal to Kitty, and the two of them share a psychic bond. Wolverine became something of a mentor to Kitty despite his usually gruff personality. Storm came to view Kitty as the daughter she never had.

Though Xavier has threatened to reassign Kitty to the New Mutants, a team of younger mutants he established in the absence of the X-Men, ever since the X-Men returned from outer space, she never ended up joining the group, who she derisively calls the "X-Babies". Kitty was later abducted by the Morlocks and nearly forced to wed Caliban. She was then abducted by the White Queen, but rescued by the New Mutants.

During this time, Kitty began to date Colossus, although this did not last long. Colossus developed feelings for an alien woman named Zsaji whom he met on the Beyonder's planet in the first Secret Wars. Colossus' feelings toward Zsaji were primarily a side effect of her own unique healing abilities, which she had used on him after he became injured. Regardless, Colossus' feelings were real and he returned to Earth consumed with grief after Zsaji's death. He admitted to Kitty that he loved Zsaji, which hurt her deeply and ended the budding romantic relationship.  Kitty had made good friends with a local boy from Salem Central named Doug Ramsey around this time, but her feelings for him never went as deep as his for her, and they never actually dated, though they remained close, even more so after Doug's status as a mutant was revealed and he joined the New Mutants under the codename Cypher. They remained friends until his death some time later.

Ogun
During the 1984–1985 Kitty Pryde and Wolverine miniseries, Kitty is possessed by a demon, the ninja Ogun. Ogun psychically bestows upon Kitty a virtual lifetime of martial arts training. Kitty was brainwashed by Ogun into becoming a ninja assassin, and was sent to attack Wolverine. Kitty is able to resist Ogun's influence with Wolverine's help, and the two form a strong teacher/student bond, which helps them in vanquishing Ogun. Kitty returns to the X-Men, no longer the innocent girl they once knew, and officially adopts the codename Shadowcat.

Morlock Massacre
While trying to save Rogue, Kitty was badly injured by Harpoon's energy spear during the Mutant Massacre story arc, in the massacre of the Morlocks, with the result that she lost control of her power and was stuck in an intangible state and could not regain her solidity. She was rushed to Muir Island along with other surviving casualties of the Massacre to be tended to by Moira MacTaggert. MacTaggert was able to keep Kitty's condition from deteriorating to the point where she completely lost physical substance and ceased to exist, but was not able to do any more to help her.

At this time, Kitty's natural state was to be intangible. Where she once had to make a conscious effort to phase, she could now only maintain her solidity through an act of conscious will. The X-Men went to Reed Richards, Mister Fantastic of the Fantastic Four, for aid, but Richards initially refused because he was not sure he would be able to help.

Having nowhere else to go, the X-Men turned to Richards' enemy Doctor Doom. This created a moral dilemma for both the X-Men and the Fantastic Four, and both teams fought each other because the Fantastic Four were trying to stop the treatment while the X-Men were determined to save Kitty's life. In the end, both the personal crisis of the Fantastic Four and the life of Shadowcat were saved after Franklin Richards, with the help of Lockheed, brought both teams to their senses. Kitty has since recovered from this state and now has full control over her power again.

Excalibur
Among the others injured and brought to Muir Isle were Colossus and Nightcrawler, although Colossus left the United Kingdom shortly after being released from MacTaggert's care to join the rest of the X-Men on their mission to battle the Adversary. The X-Men sacrificed their lives to defeat the Adversary, the battle and their sacrifice was televised and broadcast across the world. The X-Men were resurrected later in the same issue, unknown to the world at large, but chose to keep a low profile and perpetuate the belief that they were still dead. This strategy was enforced to more effectively fight their enemies. This meant avoiding contact with friends and family, including Kitty. Thinking the X-Men were dead, Kitty and Nightcrawler joined Rachel Summers, Captain Britain, and Meggan to form the Britain-based team Excalibur following an adventure in which they saved Rachel from Technet. For a brief time, Kitty studied at St. Searle's School for Girls in Britain. During her time with Excalibur, Kitty developed a crush on Professor Alistaire Stuart which went unreciprocated since Alistaire was attracted to Rachel. Later, she was romantically involved with former Black Air agent Pete Wisdom. At some point Kitty was recruited by the international law enforcement agency S.H.I.E.L.D. to repair the computer system of their flying headquarters. Kitty discovered the problem was due to Ogun's spirit having infiltrated the computer system, and with the aid of Wolverine, she managed to purge Ogun's presence. During this time, Kitty was attracted to a S.H.I.E.L.D. intern her own age, and this made her begin to doubt her relationship with Wisdom. Soon after, she broke off their relationship.

Back to the X-Men

After Excalibur's dissolution, Shadowcat, Nightcrawler, and Colossus return to the X-Men. While returning, they faced a group of imposters following Cerebro, in the guise of Professor X. While tracking Mystique, she stumbles onto prophetic diaries that belonged to Irene Adler, a precognitive. During the six-month gap, Kitty visited Genosha. Whatever she experienced there is unknown (although presumably connected to her father, living on Genosha at the time), but it had a profound effect on her. She cut her hair and began to act rebelliously, also using one of Wolverine's bone claws broken off during battle as a weapon. Kitty remained with the X-Men for a while before leaving after the apparent death of Colossus. Trying to give herself a normal life, she attended the University of Chicago. During this time, her father was killed when Cassandra Nova’s Sentinels destroyed Genosha. Kitty later finds a recording of his death due to exploring footage of the attack. She is also kidnapped by William Stryker, but the X-Treme X-Men team helped her escape, and she assisted them on several missions.

At the start of Joss Whedon's run on Astonishing X-Men, Kitty once again rejoins the X-Men, despite having extreme reservations about working with the former White Queen, given their history. This was the primary reason why Frost herself wanted Kitty on the team, as a sort of "safety" should Frost ever revert to type. Frost reasoned that the person who trusted her least would be most likely to spot such behavior. On one of the team's first missions, Shadowcat discovered Colossus was alive. After some initial awkwardness, Kitty and Colossus resumed dating.

Kitty Pryde appeared alongside Colossus in the "Blinded by the Light" arc in X-Men. They are the two X-Men left to look after the students while the rest of the X-Men leave for Mystique's home in Mississippi to check up on Rogue, during which they are ambushed by the Marauders. Kitty and Colossus, meanwhile, attempt to protect the students from a faction of the Marauders led by Exodus. It is revealed over the course of the story that Kitty, worried of the Destiny Diaries' safety, devised a plan with Cyclops and Emma Frost to hide them and have Emma wipe the location from her mind. The location could only be revealed by a code word spoken to Kitty. The arc concludes with a battle between Iceman and Cannonball against the Marauders for the diaries, during which they are destroyed by Gambit.

In the "Torn" arc, the latest incarnation of the Hellfire Club begin an assault on Xavier's School. Kitty fulfilled the role that Emma Frost envisioned, personally taking down Frost and imprisoning her, only to fall under a telepathic delusion created by Hellfire member Perfection, who claimed to be the true, unreformed Emma Frost. Under this delusion, Kitty was made to believe that she and Colossus had conceived a child, which was later taken away by the X-Men because its potential mutant abilities were supposedly dangerous. Kitty reacts in the delusion by attempting to rescue the child from a near-inescapable "box" in the depths of the school, unaware that in reality she is freeing an alien entity, Stuff, who contains the trapped consciousness of Cassandra Nova, the apparent ringleader of this new Hellfire Club. A newly awakened Cyclops revealed that the new Hellfire Club, including Perfection and Nova, are actually mental projections created by a piece of Cassandra Nova's consciousness; which became lodged in Emma's mind during the X-Men's last confrontation with her, playing on her survivor's guilt over the Genoshan massacre, and utilizing Emma's telepathy to both confound the X-Men and orchestrate her (Nova's) escape from the Stuff body. As Cyclops killed the mental projections, Emma tried to force Kitty to kill her to get rid of Nova. Undeterred, Cassandra Nova switched her focus to attempt to transfer her mind to Hisako Ichiki. It appears that Nova did not succeed, as the team was transported to S.W.O.R.D.'s air station en route to Ord's Breakworld for the "Unstoppable" arc that concludes Whedon's run on Astonishing X-Men.

Breakworld
As the team prepares to end the confrontation with the Breakworld leader, the team splits up—with Kitty on the team appointed to stop the missile pointed at Earth. Kitty phases into the missile to disrupt its circuitry noting that it is composed of the same material as the rest of Breakworld, a material that is difficult and exhausting for her to phase through. After phasing for a mile into the missile, Kitty finds the center only to discover it empty. The missile is fired, causing Kitty to pass out inside of it as Beast discovers too late that due to its shape, trajectory, and lack of internal circuitry, the Breakworld's weapon is not a missile, but a bullet. As the bullet hurtles toward Earth, Kitty lies unconscious within it.

As the situation becomes increasingly dire, Emma establishes mental contact with Kitty, reassuring her that she will come out of this fine, though it eventually becomes clear to both that the situation will be grim. Kitty and Emma come to an understanding and reconciliation, Emma stating that she never wanted something like this to happen to her. Kitty then phases the bullet through Earth, but is trapped within. At the end of Giant-Size Astonishing X-Men, Scott Summers mentions that Doctor Strange, Reed Richards, and some "top men" tried to save her, but believe she has fused to the bullet, as it continues to hurtle through space. Whether she is alive or dead is unknown, though the X-Men consider her lost to them.

As a result of these events Kitty does not appear in the X-Men crossover event X-Men: Messiah Complex, since this takes place after the events of Giant-Size Astonishing X-Men. She is briefly mentioned in the aftermath of the Messiah Complex, by Colossus, Nightcrawler, and Wolverine, as the three of them discuss "losing her."

To cope with Kitty's loss, Colossus takes down a group of Russian criminals dealing in human trafficking, and gets a tattoo of the name 'Katya' on his chest. Emma begins having a recurring dream in which she hears a voice whom she believes is Kitty's trying to reach out to her.

It was later confirmed by Abigail Brand that Kitty Pryde was still alive within the bullet, but because the bullet's design would harden as time went on, it would become increasingly difficult to break the bullet open.

Return
After the X-Men move to the island of Utopia, Magneto arrives on the island professing his desire to join and support the X-Men in their effort to unite the world's remaining mutants. The X-Men reluctantly let him stay, remaining wary of him despite his efforts to gain their trust. In a final bid to gain their trust, Magneto focuses his powers, attempting to divert the interstellar path of the metal bullet Kitty is trapped in and bring her home to Earth. Meanwhile, inside the bullet, Kitty is revealed to still be alive. Unbeknownst to the others, Magneto had encountered the bullet earlier while attempting to regain his powers with the High Evolutionary and surmised that Kitty was inside. Despite this and the High Evolutionary's apparent ability to retrieve the bullet and Kitty, Magneto chose to focus on regaining his powers, secretly keeping tabs on the bullet until his decision to draw it back to Earth. During her time trapped inside the bullet, Kitty keeps herself and the bullet phased to avoid collisions with any inhabited objects in its path.

Magneto brings Kitty Pryde safely down to Earth by cracking the bullet in two and levitating Kitty to the ground. When she and Colossus try to touch, it is revealed that she is trapped in her intangible form, unable to speak, and the X-Men place her in a protective chamber similar to the one used for her following the events of the Mutant Massacre.  How Kitty survived her time in the bullet is unclear to the X-Men's science team, where the X-Men discover that all her bodily functions halted.  An analysis by Kavita Rao hypothesizes that Kitty created an intense muscle memory to keep herself and the bullet phased and has "forgotten" how to un-phase.

During a conversation with Colossus, with Emma Frost acting as the psi-conduit, Kitty picks up Emma's stray thoughts on killing the captive Sebastian Shaw, to prevent Namor from discovering she previously lied to him. While disgusted at Emma's intentions, Kitty offers a compromise. Due to her current ghost state, she is the perfect tool for making Shaw disappear.

In a storyline in Uncanny X-Men, the Breakworlders make their way to Earth. During the conflict between the Breakworlder Kr'uun and the X-Men, Kitty is slain and resurrected by Kr'uun's mate in an alien ritual, which results in her powers returning to normal.

Regenesis
Shortly thereafter, Kitty breaks up with Colossus, and decides to return with Wolverine to Westchester to open the Jean Grey School for Higher Learning. In Wolverine and the X-Men #4, she appears to be suddenly pregnant, but the pregnancy was revealed to be a Brood infestation, and it was swiftly dealt with by a team of X-Men. Since returning to Westchester, Kitty has shared several kisses with Iceman. During the events of Avengers vs. X-Men, Kitty does not take a side, but instead decides to stay at the school to work with the students.  Once Bobby returned from working with the X-Men after realizing that the Phoenix had corrupted them, he and Kitty finally decide to go on a date.

All-New X-Men
After Beast brings the original five X-Men into the future to stop Cyclops in the present, Kitty volunteers to take responsibility for the temporally relocated X-Men while they work to undo this dark future. This soon puts her at odds with the rest of her team as they believed the original five should go back to their own time to prevent any damage to the space-time continuity. Eventually, this leads Kitty to take the decision of abandoning the school with the time-displaced X-Men and join Cyclops's X-Men at the New Xavier School. During the first few weeks at the New Xavier School, Jean Grey is abducted by the Shiar Empire to stand trial for her future self's crimes. Kitty and the time-displaced X-Men team up with the Guardians of the Galaxy and succeed in rescuing Jean from the Shiar. At the conclusion of the storyline, Kitty begins a long-distance, flirtatious relationship with Starlord, Peter Quill.

The Black Vortex
In the following weeks, Kitty's relationship with Peter Quill evolves more and more as they developed stronger feelings for each other every day. At one point, Quill gets captured during one of their dates and she has no option but to go to his rescue, despite her fear of space as a result of her being trapped on the giant space bullet. After rescuing Peter, she decides to stay in space with him. Then, Kitty convinces Peter to steal a powerful artifact called the Black Vortex from his father J'son. Soon, they find themselves being chased by J'son's assassination squad, the Slaughter Lords. In despair, they request the aid of the X-Men and the Guardians of the Galaxy to protect the Vortex. After a few of their own friends can't resist the temptation and submit to the Vortex, betray the team, and escape with the artifact; the team splits and Kitty stays in Spartax to help an orphanage. She is encased in amber after Thane (who was allied with J'son) freezes the whole planet along with the people inside it; but thanks to her phasing powers, she manages to get out of the amber. Then the Brood attacks Spartax, planning to use every encased person to lay eggs and create an army of Brood to start invading other planets and conquering them. Kitty feels the only way to stop them is by submitting to the Vortex herself as she's the only one who can resist the cosmic corruption. She reluctantly submits and becomes a being of unlimited power. After being reminded of the love between her and Peter Quill, she goes back and phases all the amber that encased Spartax, along with the Broods trying to infect the people, and sends them all to another dimension. Kitty doesn't give up the cosmic power but admits to Peter that she is afraid of it. Peter promises her that he will never abandon her no matter how much she changes. Then, Peter kneels and proposes marriage to Kitty. She, with tears in her eyes, accepts. Later when Star Lord is declared Emperor of Spartax she is told she will become the first lady of Spartax.

Guardians of the Galaxy
Kitty takes on the mantle of Star Lord and joins the Guardians of the Galaxy in Peter Quill's place so he can take on his royal duties. When Hala the Accuser massacres Spartax in an attempt to make Quill pay for J'son's actions against her people, she initially easily lays waste to the capitol and overpowers the Guardians. After the Guardians regroup and formulate a strategy to defeat her, Kitty manages to partially phase Hala into the ground so the rest of the Guardians can knock her out and separate her from her weapon. After Quill loses his title as king he and Kitty end up on a mission with the rest of the Guardians on a concentration camp prison planet owned by the Badoon after Gamora gave them information on it so they can free Angela. Once there, Kitty has a personal reaction upon seeing the prisoners and makes it her mission to liberate everyone there and defeat the captors, as it reminds her of Nazi concentration camps. After Quill gets captured and sentenced to death in an arena battle, Kitty finds and kills one of the Badoon leaders by phasing his heart out of his body. When Captain Marvel summons the Guardians to Earth to help her address Tony Stark, Kitty learns that Thanos is a prisoner on Earth and tries to convince Quill to tell Gamora. When fighting starts Kitty woefully realizes that some of her former students are on Tony Stark's side instead of fighting with Captain Marvel. During the battle the Guardians' ship was destroyed, effectively stranding them on Earth. After helping the Guardians stop Thanos from leading an invasion from the Negative Zone the Guardians are given a new ship; however, Kitty decides to stay on Earth and ends her time with the Guardians and Quill.

Leading the X-Men

Upon returning to Earth, Kitty hopes to finally regain a semblance of a normal life but ends up approached by Storm, who informs Kitty of everything the X-Men have gone through while Kitty was away. Storm announces to Kitty that she intends to step down as leader of the X-Men due to the guilt that she feels for leading the X-Men to war and offers Kitty her position. After touring X-Haven and seeing how much things have changed and how much things need to change for the better, Kitty agrees to lead the X-Men as long as Storm remains on the team. Her next act is to relocate the mansion from Limbo to Central Park, New York so the X-Men can refocus on being part of the world instead of fearing it under the belief that if the X-Men truly are to be seen as heroes, then they need to actually live in the world that they are trying to save instead of constantly worrying about their own survival.

Under Kitty's new leadership, the X-Men go through some small changes to shed their history and make new names for themselves, such as convincing Rachel Summers to change her code name to Prestige and renaming the mansion as The Xavier Institute for Mutant Education and Outreach. Kitty learns first-hand how hard it is to balance leading the X-Men as well as managing the mansion when there are many political factors trying to deliberately get in the way of the X-Men. She also begins to have awkward one-on-one moments with Colossus; they try to remain friends, but given their long history their interactions swiftly become complicated. Kitty's first case as field leader of the X-Men sees her and her team taking on a new Brotherhood of Evil Mutants. After discovering that an outspoken anti-mutant politician brainwashed this new Brotherhood to work for her to publicly discredit mutants, Kitty threatened to expose her if she continued exploiting mutants for her own personal gain.

Dawn of X
After Krakoa became a new sovereign nation for Mutants, Kitty Pryde, now going by Captain Kate Pryde, discovers she is the sole mutant who is, for unknown reasons, unable to use the various warp gates leading to Krakoa. It is implied that she has done something to anger Krakoa, but that restriction does not mean Kitty cannot use other means to reach the mutant homeland. She steals a boat and sets sail for the island. Kitty's time on Krakoa proves to be just as fruitless, as the island's natural resources (like flowers that grow into biome homes) are similarly prohibited to Kitty. Emma Frost comes asking Kitty to take up a special mission: taking a bigger boat out to serve as pirate captain on the X-Men's mission to liberate mutants trapped in oppressive countries that do not recognize mutant sovereignty, while also smuggling and supplying for Emma's Hellfire Trading Company the lifesaving drugs the X-Men provide to humans. Kate Pryde is later appointed the new Red Queen of the Hellfire Trading Company by Emma Frost, to the dismay of Sebastian Shaw. Seeing Pryde as an obstacle to his complete control of the Hellfire Corporation, Shaw began plotting against Kate and her crew. After taking notice how Emma became overprotective of the newly crowned Red Queen, Shaw realized that for the same reason she can't travel through Krakoa's gates nor read or understand the Krakoan language until Emma implanted it in her brain, the X-Men's Resurrection Protocols also won't apply to her, which means Kate cannot be resurrected if she died. He orchestrated a distraction by paying off human supremacists Homines Verendi to stage an attack on his own son. Once Kate was defenseless, Shaw emerged from below deck and ensnared Lockheed with a net gun, making him a helpless hostage. He then released Krakoan seeds at her feet, which wrapped around her and prevented her from using her powers. He then dropped her and Lockheed into the sea. While Lockheed was able to survive, Kate sank helplessly, and once her head dropped under the surface, she had no air left and drowned instantly. Her death is later confirmed by Bishop as he retrieves Kate's body, as it was also established that the Resurrection Protocols indeed do not apply to Kate, as the Five, for reasons unknown, cannot resurrect her. However, she is later resurrected, as Emma Frost realized that it was due to the nature of Kate's intangibility powers that her mindless body was unable to break out of the egg.

Powers and abilities

Kitty is a mutant with the ability to pass through solid matter by passing her atomic particles through the spaces between the atoms of the object through which she is moving. In this way she and the object through which she is passing can temporarily merge without interacting, and each is unharmed when Shadowcat has finished passing through the object. This process is called "phasing" or quantum tunneling and it renders her almost completely intangible to physical touch. Shadowcat passes through objects at the same speed at which she is moving before she enters them. Since she is unable to breathe while inside an object, she can only continuously phase through solid objects (as when she travels underground) as long as she can hold her breath. However, contrary depictions of the duration of her phasing ability have been presented, such as when she has phased miles within an object. The use of her abilities also interferes with any electrical systems as she passes through by disrupting the flow of electrons from atom to atom, including the bio-electric systems of living bodies if she concentrates in the right way. This typically causes machines to malfunction or be destroyed as she phases through them, and can induce shock and unconsciousness in living beings.

Using her power began as an optional ability, but for a period (over ten years of published comics, approximately two years in-continuity) Kitty existed in a naturally "phased" state, and had to consciously choose to become solid. Kitty has returned to her original form and is normally solid and must choose to use her power.  While phasing, she does not physically walk on surfaces, but rather interacts with the molecules of air above them, allowing her to ascend and descend, causing her to seemingly walk on air. While phased, she is immune to most physical attacks, and has inconsistent showings of some resistance to telepathy. The density of some materials (such as adamantium) can prove deleterious to her phasing, causing her to be severely disoriented or experience pain if she tries to pass through them.  Some energy attacks also prove problematic for Kitty. For example, an energy blast fired by Harpoon, a member of the Marauders, caused her to lose her ability to become fully tangible for months. Magic and magical beings can also harm her in her phased state, as demonstrated in a battle with a N'Garai demon whose claws left no visible marks, but caused Kitty severe pain as they passed through her intangible body.

Kitty can also extend her powers to phase other people and objects. She is able to phase at least six other people (or objects of similar mass) with her, so long as they establish and maintain physical contact with her. She can extend her phasing effect to her own clothing or any other object with mass up to that of a small truck, as long as she remains in contact with it. Kitty can also make objects intangible by maintaining contact with them. She has threatened to leave people phased into a wall, and used her power offensively to harm the Technarch Magus, and Danger.

Kitty's powers seem to have increased over the years. During an X-Treme X-Men story arc in which she is kidnapped by Reverend William Stryker, she phases out of sync with Earth's rotation to move from one place in the world (only east or west) to another seemingly instantaneously. At the climax of Astonishing X-Men, Kitty phases a 10 mi (16 km) long "bullet" composed of super-dense alien metals through the entire planet Earth. This feat caused her considerable strain, but she is unable to phase out of the bullet. Moreover, originally Kitty found it difficult or impossible to phase only part of her body at a time. In the Days of Future Past story arc, she is possessed by her older future self, allowing her to solidify only her shoulder while phasing the rest of her body through Destiny—a feat explicitly beyond the 13-year-old Kitty's abilities.  By contrast, the Kitty Pryde of Joss Whedon's run can punch and kick someone standing on the other side of a wall, selectively phasing and unphasing body parts as necessary. She can even run and leap through an armed opponent, grabbing their weapon as she passes by, which presumably requires her to solidify only the surface area of the palms of her hands and then immediately phase both her palms and the weapon.

Besides her mutant powers, Kitty is a genius in the field of applied technology and computer science. She is highly talented in the design and use of computer hardware. She is a skilled pilot of piston and jet engine aircraft, and a competent pilot of certain advanced interstellar vehicles. She has previously shown a unique ability to wield the Soulsword and also be harmed by it. Since her possession by the ninja demon Ogun, she has been consistently shown to be an excellent hand-to-hand combatant, having since been endowed with a lifetime of training in the martial arts of Japanese ninja and samurai.

She is a professional-level dancer in both ballet and modern dance. She speaks fluent English, Japanese, Russian, and the royal and standard languages of the alien Shi'ar and Skrull, and has moderate expertise in Gaelic, Hebrew, and German.

Kitty also shares a mental/empathic connection with her pet dragon Lockheed; both she and the alien dragon can "sense" each other's presence at times and generally understand one another's thoughts and actions.

When Kitty used the Black Vortex, her powers were augmented to a cosmic scale making her a god-like being. She can phase through any material of any density and can even phase a planet out of Thane's amber, whereas in her normal state it is an extremely difficult task to simply phase herself out of the amber. She can also apparently transverse between the planes of the multiverse and is immune to the effects of space. Her appearance can be changed but her natural form appears to be rather gaseous in look.

Cultural impact and legacy

Critical reception 
Chris Arrant of Newsarama referred to Kitty Pryde as one of the "best Marvel characters of all time," writing, "The X-Men are amazing - uncanny, even - but it wasn't until Kitty Pryde entered the picture that readers gained a real perspective of how uncanny. Created as a 'girl next door'/grounded character in the original Chris Claremont/John Byrne era, Shadowcat was a hit character from the start - and she only got better over the years. [...] Of all the mutant characters, Kitty Pryde has proven to be the most human when it comes to evolution and growth, And that doesn't just make it stand out among her fellow X-Men, but among the entire Marvel Comics pantheon as well." David Uzumeri of ComicsAlliance described Kitty Pryde as a "fan-favorite phasing mutant," stating, "She had an appropriately temporary permanent goodbye, and then she was gone, careening through the void in a ballistic dong. When you think about it, this is somewhat appropriate for a character who's largely fulfilled the role of "dream girlfriend" for the majority of X-Men writers and readers. Because for a character who purportedly acts as a role model for girls and women, she's always seemed like more of a wish-fulfillment fantasy for nerdy teenagers (and fetishistic British comic writers). Kitty was always pretty close to perfect; whatever errors she made were always well-intentioned. [...] The fact is, Kitty's moral perfection has become her character, since everyone loves her so much that nobody wants to drag her through any mud. Because she almost never makes mistakes, she can't really progress as a character by learning from them – she's a patron saint." Eric Diaz of Nerdist called Kitty Pryde "smart and resourceful," saying, "The character of Kitty was introduced in 1980, in the middle of the legendary run from creators Chris Claremont and John Byrne on Uncanny X-Men. The 14 year old mutant, who could phase through solid objects, was the youngest member of the team and the wish fulfillment character for millions of kids who read X-Men comics. Fans got to see Kitty grow up to become a competent and capable leader over the years. For non-comics fans, she was maybe best known for being part of the X-Men arcade game from the early ’90s, which was based on the animated pilot Pryde of the X-Men.But Katherine Pryde, despite her popularity, has never had much in the way of solo stories to base a movie on." Kat Vendetti of ComicsVerse called Kitty Pryde a "protector and a hero," asserting, "Throughout her history, Kitty Pryde’s characterization has been both intricate and multifaceted. She has used her strength and wit to save the X-Men, but she also embraces her emotions to stand up for what she wants. She can save the day when others can’t, and she’s also not afraid to express her more vulnerable sides. Through it all, Kitty Pryde never shies away from representing everything she stands for. From the moment we met her and as we continue to know her, Kitty has proven time and again to be a natural and worthy leader. Kitty Pryde remains the best choice to lead the team in X-Men Gold; she has everything it takes to be the best leader the X-Men have ever had."

Jonathan Thompson of CBR.com referred to Kitty Pryde as the "heart and soul of the X-Men," stating, "Ever since she first appeared in 1980’s Uncanny X-Men #129, Kitty Pryde has been a symbol of female empowerment for fans. She may have seemed like just another teenage mutant who can phase through solid matter, but she was not to be underestimated. [...] Yet, despite this long history in the comics, many people may not know Kitty as well as they think they do. How can she send someone’s consciousness back in time in X-Men: Days of Future Past? How powerful is she? Does she have a romantic past with Colossus in the films? Is that story about the origin of her name true? If you got your X-Men education from the films rather than the comics, there is a lot worth learning about Kitty that makes her a fuller character on the screen. Alternatively, if you have followed Kitty for years through the source material, you may have some questions (or critiques) regarding the live-action version. And then, of course, there is the world of animation which reinterpreted Kitty in a few different ways. No matter what your preferred medium is, there is undoubtedly something more to learn about her." Nick Abadzis of Tor.com wrote, "Kitty led a long line of mutant teenagers who, in turn, represent the disaffected and disenchanted, the rebellious and the geeky. But Kitty was the first and somehow remains the archetype. Her powers initially seemed a secondary element in the appeal of the character, whose intelligence and Jewish ancestry were highlighted. Yet Kitty’s ability to “phase” was, to a degree, an ingenious metaphor for that teenage desire to sometimes just disappear. Who, at that age, hasn’t sometimes felt dumb and socially awkward enough to want the world to just swallow them up? Kitty could do it—and it was so cool. [...] Outside the X-Men the reader, through Kitty, caught further glimpses of what it might be like to be a mutant—or, crucially, a member of any minority group—which, in turn, helped elevate the comic book from simple monthly melodrama into an ongoing saga and pop cultural phenomenon." Thomas Bacon of Screen Rant asserted, "Nobody could have predicted just how influential Kitty Pryde would be. In a recent Twitter thread, The Claremont Run noted Kitty became Claremont's favorite "viewpoint character," the lens through which readers experienced the X-Men. It was a smart move because Claremont was indulging in increasingly adult themes. Kitty made her debut in the middle of the Dark Phoenix Saga - and her youthful perspective heightened the narrative impact. But Claremont was quick to ensure readers that Kitty was a capable and competent new addition [...] Brian Bendis openly admits she was his comic book crush, which explains why Kitty wound up dating Peter Parker in his Ultimate Spider-Man relaunch. Warren Ellis infamously aged her up so she could have a relationship with the mutant Pete Wisdom, who was basically Ellis' own analog in the Marvel Comics Universe. But her greatest impact was through Joss Whedon, who recalled that famous issue of a teenager who was capable enough to take down a demon when he was creating Buffy the Vampire Slayer. In fact, Whedon has gone so far as to refer to Kitty as the mother of Buffy, the main inspiration for the Slayer." Hilary Goldstein and Richard George of IGN stated, "Most mutants come to Xavier's having experienced great trauma and difficulty in their youth. Kitty arrived as an innocent with the seemingly innocuous power to turn intangible. She is the mutant everyman, the common girl turned superhero. Marvel has attempted to replicate Kitty Pryde on several occasions, most notably with Jubilee, but there's something special about Kitty that puts her above the rest. She's strong-willed, creative and fiercely loyal. Just as her pet dragon, Lockheed, became instantly attached to Kitty, we were hooked early on. Who could have guessed long ago that she would become one of the most endearing characters in the X-Men Universe?"

Accolades 

 In 2011 Wizard ranked Kitty Pryde 13th in their "200 Greatest Comic Characters of All Time" list.
 In 2011, IGN ranked Kitty Pryde 47th in their "Top 100 Comic Book Heroes" list.
 In 2011, IGN ranked Kitty Pryde 3rd in their "Top 25 X-Men" list.
 In 2014, Entertainment Weekly ranked Kitty Pryde 18th in their "Let's rank every X-Man ever" list.
 In 2017, Comicbook.com ranked Kitty Pryde 9th in their "10 Best X-Men" list.
 In 2018, CBR.com ranked Kitty Pryde 7th in their "X-Men's Greatest Leaders" list.
 In 2018, CBR.com ranked Kitty Pryde 12th in their "20 Most Powerful Mutants From The '80s" list.
 In 2018, GameSpot ranked Kitty Pryde 21st in their "50 Most Important Superheroes" list.
 In 2019, CBR.com ranked Kitty Pryde 7th in their "10 Deadliest Ninja In Marvel Comics" list.
 In 2019, Comicbook.com ranked Kitty Pryde 20th in their "50 Most Important Superheroes Ever" list.
 In 2021, CBR.com ranked Kitty Pryde 1st in their "10 Best Characters John Byrne Created" list.
 In 2021, CBR.com ranked Kitty Pryde 9th in their "Marvel: 10 Smartest Female Characters" list.
 In 2021, CBR.com ranked Kate Pryde 4th in their "10 Smartest Marvel Sidekicks" list.
 In 2021, Screen Rant ranked Kitty Pryde 1st in their "10 Strongest X-Men" list.
 In 2022, Newsarama ranked Kitty Pryde 3rd in their "The best Marvel characters of all time" list, 4th in their "Best X-Men members of all time" list, and 17th in their "The best female superheroes" list.
 In 2022, CBR.com ranked Kitty Pryde 7th in their "10 Greatest X-Men, Ranked By Experience" list and 10th in their "X-Men's Greatest Leaders, Ranked By Experience" list.
 In 2022, Screen Rant ranked Kitty Pryde 1st in their "10 X-Men Characters, Ranked By Likability" list and 6th in their "Top 10 X-Men, Ranked by Fighting Skills" list.

Literary reception

Volumes

Star-Lord and Kitty Pryde - 2015 
According to Diamond Comic Distributors, Star-Lord and Kitty Pryde #1 was the 39th best selling comic book in July 2015.

Brian Delpozo of ComicsVerse stated, "Star-Lord and Kitty Pryde #1 is one of the best issues to come out of Marvel’s “Secret Wars” storyline so far. While its plot is a bit exposition heavy at the start, it eventually starts moving at a brisk pace, with very strong characters and fun art. If the darkness of most of Battleworld is bringing you down, I’d definitely recommend giving this issue a read." Levi Hunt of IGN gave Star-Lord and Kitty Pryde #1 a grade of 8.8 out of 10, writing, "Star-Lord and Kitty Pryde is a Disney movie of a comic—and that’s not just because Peter Quill spends half the issue singing Little Mermaid songs. Peter is one of the only survivors of the 616-Marvel Universe still alive and now he is hiding out among God Doom’s people, just trying not to get caught. Suddenly his life changes when he meets an alternate-reality version of his fiancé – Kitty Pryde. This book has all the hijinks, humor, and heart of Tangled or Aladdin, and that’s just where the Disney comparisons start. Alti Firmansyah draws this book with all of expressive, big-eyed, joy of Disney minimalism. It perfectly complements Sam Humphries’s wonderful story and makes for an enjoyable read for (almost) all ages."

Other versions

In addition to her mainstream incarnation, Kitty Pryde has been depicted in other fictional universes.

Age of Apocalypse

In the Age of Apocalypse reality, Kitty grows up under harsh circumstances and her nature reflects it. She has short hair, tight clothes, and chain smokes cigarettes. Her parents are killed in the Chicago Cullings, and she is forcibly recruited into Apocalypse's army, but is later rescued by Colossus. Magneto puts Shadowcat under Weapon X's training, hoping to turn her into the X-Men's assassin, and she is given a set of retractable artificial claws around each wrist to better imitate her teacher's fighting style. After the fallout between Colossus and Magneto, Shadowcat sides with Colossus, whom she has married. Instead of leaving the fight against Apocalypse altogether, the couple become the teachers of Generation Next. The two submit their trainees to harsh situations, giving them little comfort despite the fact that Shadowcat is close to the age of her students.

Shadowcat assists the team in rescuing Illyana Rasputin from the Seattle Core, and, at Colossus' behest, abandons her students after Illyana is saved. She is killed by Colossus in his ruthless obsession to protect his sister, Illyana; coming between an enraged Colossus and his endangered sister, Shadowcat never believed he would harm her.

Days of Future Past
In the Days of Future Past timeline (Earth-811), Shadowcat goes by the name Kate Pryde. Kate attempts to go back in time to prevent the assassination of Senator Robert Kelly by Mystique and the Brotherhood of Evil Mutants. She succeeds, only to create a separate timeline where the events of her past still come to pass. After returning to her own time Kate helps Rachel Summers escape back to the timeline she just created. Captured by Sentinels, Kate escapes by phasing through her inhibitor collar and fell into a time warp, causing her to merge with the Sentinel that was scanning her, and arrives in the timeline Rachel is inhabiting. Kate's mind settles in a small, metal, off-spherical body and becomes known as Widget. After a few adventures in that timeline, mostly in company with her Earth-616 counterpart's team Excalibur, Kate regains her memory and returns to her original timeline where she is able to reprogram the ruling Sentinels to protect life, ending their tyranny.

Earth X
In Earth X it is revealed in the appendix of issue six that Kitty Pryde is killed saving Colossus while he could not shift into his metal form.  Instead of phasing the bullet through her, she heroically takes the bullet and is killed.

Exiles

A version of Kitty Pryde codenamed Cat first appeared in Exiles #96. She is younger than her Earth-616 counterpart. She has the appearance and powers of the normal Shadowcat although she wears a different costume. Prior to her joining the Exiles, this version of Kitty had been recruited by Emma Frost as one of the core agents of the Hellfire Club's strike force. She helps Psylocke defeat Doom's soldiers who have invaded the Panoptichron. She helps retrieve Blink, Morph, and Sabretooth from being scattered across the multiverse. She works as a computer expert for the team and is a full member of the Exiles.

Cat's skill with using her powers means she is not tied to any dimension and can see through various realities, including those of the mind (for instance seeing the various personalities in Sage's mind as "ghosts" surrounding her). Her arrival in the Crystal Palace and connection to its computers has increased this, giving her the ability to "cascade" through different alternative versions of herself, altering her appearance and details of her powers. Amongst other versions, she has assumed the form of a Kitty Pryde with the appearance and powers of Tigra. During the New Exiles' last mission Cat faced off against Madame Hydra (Sue Storm) and killed her at the cost of her own life.

There has been another version of Kitty that appeared in the King Hyperion story arc (Exiles #38-40). She had survived an attack on the X-Mansion by the Sentinels. The Colossus from her universe had been killed in the attack but she had the same feelings towards Weapon X's Colossus even though he was not her Colossus. The two eventually fell in love with each other. Unfortunately this did not last since she died with Colossus when they were shot into the empty vacuum of space by Hyperion.

House of M
When the Scarlet Witch altered reality in the 616 Universe, creating the reality known as House of M where mutants were the dominant population, Kitty Pryde was a teacher in a public middle school in Cincinnati, Ohio. Like many of the heroes of Earth 616, she is reminded of the true reality by Layla Miller and recruited in the fight to restore reality.

Magik
In the limited series Magik (Illyana and Storm), an alternative reality Kitty renames herself "Cat" after she is mutated by the demonic sorcerer Belasco into a more feline form, with cat eyes, whiskers, a tail, and enhanced physical abilities and senses.  Trapped in Belasco's Limbo, Cat takes a militant view towards defeating the sorcerer, eschewing the magic that her reality's Storm embraces, instead turning to skills in swordplay and physical combat. She tries to save the Illyana Rasputin of Earth-616 from corruption through magic by taking Illyana into the wilderness of Limbo and teaching the child to fight and survive. Like the Kitty Pryde of Earth-616 eventually would, Cat became Illyana's best friend, but more in the role of an older sister due to the difference in their ages.

Cat's plan goes awry when the pair's attempt to confront Belasco fails, at the cost of the life of an enslaved Nightcrawler; Illyana falls under Belasco's influence and Cat is further transformed towards a feline, with a semi-animalistic mind completely loyal to Belasco. Cat is eventually slain by Illyana when Belasco sets Cat upon his rebellious apprentice; facing death at Cat's hands and knowing that, deep down, a part of Kitty still exists and hates her enslavement, Illyana broke Cat's neck in self-defense.

Long after Illyana overthrows Belasco, escapes Limbo, and becomes a member of the junior X-Men team known as the New Mutants, Cat's remains are found by the team in Limbo's throne room. By then she had completely decomposed to a skeleton. Illyana, facing a rebellion of Limbo's demon population that threatened to overrun Earth, smashed Cat's skull in rage over the demonic taint that Belasco left on her soul and frustration over the horrible choice she had to make to kill Cat.

Marvel Zombies
Kitty is briefly shown in the background as a zombie in Ultimate Fantastic Four #23, despite her mutant phasing powers. She is also seen in Marvel Zombies: Dead Days, when zombie Alpha Flight attack the X-Men. This would appear to have been retconned, though, as of Marvel Zombies: Halloween, which depicts her and her son Peter with Colossus surviving for several years in an out of the way house farm, encountering zombies, but, fortunately, being rescued by Mephisto, who dispatched the remaining zombies.

The Earth-91126/Earth-Z Kitty is recruited by Earth-2149/Marvel Zombies Spider-Man to help him develop a cure for the zombie hunger, on the grounds that her powers mean that she would be in no danger from him if he should succumb to his zombie instincts, but she is later seemingly killed when the zombie Quasar holds her underwater until she is forced to become solid once more, allowing the infected Namor to eat her flesh (much to the rage of the zombie Wolverine, of Earth-2149).

Mutant X
Storm was taken by the vampire Dracula and unlike Earth 616, she does not return. Kitty goes off to battle her, either to save or kill her. Kitty slays several vampires in the way but Storm proves too much for her and Kitty becomes her unwilling slave for some time. She later shows up as the Black Queen of the Hellfire Club and seems to be none too happy with Storm. It's also hinted that she was engaged or going to be engaged to Colossus. Her ultimate fate at the end of the series is unknown.

Lightning Force
In the reality of Earth-597, an alternative universe where World War II was won by Nazi Germany, Kitty is forced to serve as Shadowcat alongside Nightcrawler, Meggan, and Hauptmann Englande as a member of the Lightning Force (a version of Excalibur), made a virtual slave because of her Jewish heritage. She leads a sad existence and is easily identified by her shaved head and the Star of David tattooed on her forehead. It is indicated, from her own statements and those made by her reality's counterpart of Moira MacTaggert, that this Shadowcat is a true ghost, raised from the dead by a combination of science and magic and bound to serve the Nazi regime. This Shadowcat had the added ability to disrupt life force with her phasing power, knocking her victims unconscious, much like how her counterpart in the "prime" Marvel Universe (Earth-616) can disrupt technology that she phases through. She is also able to alter her facial features to a "demonic" aspect when attacking enemies or else responding to aggressive, commanding behavior from her superiors.

Pirate Kitty
Kitty tells Illyana a bedtime story and casts herself as Pirate Kitty Pryde, captain of the Abdul Alhazred, who operated in a magical world. Unlike her mainstream counterpart, she did not have any mutant powers and wore a classic pirate outfit which also included her Star of David necklace. She was also sometimes known as Colleen. Kitty was good friends of her version of Colossus, the Bamfs (Nightcrawler), Windrider (Storm), the "Fiend-with-no-name" (later revealed to be named "Mean") (Wolverine) and Lockheed (an alternative version of the X-Jet). Kitty also helped her versions of Professor X and Cyclops capture and cure that universe's version of Dark Phoenix.

At first she was only a fairy tale character, but later it is revealed that her fairy tale is actually an alternative universe. (In fact, several members of this universe, the Bamfs, would later come to Earth-616 to cause trouble.) When Earth-616's Nightcrawler was temporarily stranded in her world, Kitty helped him defeat the sorcerer Shagreen and also encountered the Earth-616 versions of Illyana, Lockheed, and herself.

Professor W's X-Men
In the native universe of the Exiles member Nocturne, Kitty is a senior member of the X-Men led by Nightcrawler. She is a teacher and TJ refers to her as "Aunt Kate". During a fight with Apocalypse Kitty gets exposed to a machine that reverts her to a younger stage of her life when she had only been with the X-Men a few weeks. Nocturne helps Kitty fit into the school and becomes her best friend. She also proves useful in the fight against the Brotherhood led by Cyclops.

Ruins
Imprisoned alongside other mutants at a prison camp in Texas by President X, Kitty attempted to use her phasing powers to escape, only to get stuck halfway through her cell door, losing three feet of intestines in the process.

Secret Wars (2015)
During the Secret Wars storyline, a version of Kitty named Kitten resides in the wuxia-inspired K'un-L'un region of Battleworld. In this reality, Kitten is a martial artist who joins Callisto's band of outcasts after being expelled from her school for attempting a forbidden technique, a side effect of which left her intangible. Kitten and her fellow outcasts became pupils of Shang-Chi, the exiled son of Emperor Zheng Zu. Dubbing their new school The Lowest Caste, Shang-Chi represents the group as their master for the tournament deciding the next Emperor of K'un-L'un, hoping to usurp his father's tyrannical rule. Kitten accompanies Shang-Chi for each of his fights in the Thirteen Chambers. During his final fight with Zu, Shang-Chi uses Kitten's technique of intangibility, which leads to his eventual victory and replaces his father as the new Emperor of K'un-L'un.

Ultimate Marvel  

The Ultimate version of Shadowcat (Kitty Pryde) first appears as a 14-year-old girl in Ultimate X-Men #21. She is also Jewish and wears the Star of David around her neck, but does not appear to possess the same genius IQ as her mainstream (Earth-616) counterpart.

Kitty's mother, worried about Kitty's mutation, seeks help from Professor Charles Xavier. Kitty becomes a student at Xavier's school, when her mother allows her to attend under the condition she does not take part in any X-Men missions, nor train in any "Danger Room" simulations. Kitty soon rebels against this and joins the X-Men as their youngest member. She idolizes Spider-Man and has a crush on him; she even dates Peter Parker for a time. After a fierce argument with Professor Xavier concerning Peter's secret identity, which his Aunt May had just found out about, Kitty leaves the X-Men and enrolls in Peter's school. Their relationship is strained after their romantic involvement (as superheroes) becomes publicly known, making it impossible for them to date anymore in their civilian identities, and eventually comes to an end when Peter realizes he cannot get over his feelings for Mary Jane. However, Kitty still retains strong feelings for him.

Following the disastrous flood triggered by Magneto and the subsequent ban of public use of mutant powers, Kitty assumes the identity of the Shroud. Kitty also discovers that she can also decrease the space between her atoms make herself super-dense, giving her both superhuman strength and durability. When the authorities see Kitty as a threat, she enters into a fierce rage and demonstrates these powers for the first time to her friends. She is strong and angry enough to punch Spider-Man several feet through the air. She eventually escapes and goes into hiding in the now abandoned Morlock Tunnel with Iceman and the Human Torch after Peter Parker's death.

Kitty makes an appearance in Ultimate Comics: X, locating Jimmy Hudson, who is revealed to be Wolverine's son. Kitty was charged by Logan before his death to locate Jimmy and reveal his true origins to him.

After the death of Spider-Man she formed new team of X-Men consisting of herself, Iceman and the Human Torch. They soon rescued the mutant Rogue from the mutant-hunting Nimrod robots, going on to recruit Jimmy Hudson into their group as well. After killing the mutant-hunting William Stryker, Kitty decided to leave New York for the Southwest along with Bobby, Rogue, and Jimmy (leaving only Johnny behind) to save the mutants there and defeat the Nimrods, now controlled by the deceased Stryker's consciousness.

Spider-Gwen
In the reality where Gwen Stacy is Spider-Woman, Kitty is an agent of S.H.I.E.L.D.'s Black Ops department, where she works closely with Wolverine to keep him in check and to help him fight his immortal curse. Like the Age of Apocalypse version, she also wields artificial claws on her wrists. It's revealed that she works with Logan out of guilt, as Stryker forced her to use her powers to subject Logan to the Weapon X experiment.

What If
 In What if Phoenix Had Not Died, Kitty is obliterated by Dark Phoenix before she destroyed the Earth.
 In What If the X-Men had Lost Inferno?, Kitty is one of the last eight remaining superheroes on the planet. She is slain by a demonic Wolverine, but her death makes Wolverine come to his senses and he fights against Baron Mordo, who had joined up with the demon hordes.
 In What If... Wolverine: Enemy of the State, Kitty is the only hero left to kill a Hydra-programmed Wolverine after he has taken down the Marvel Universe. Kitty was the last remaining member of the team assembled to recapture Wolverine. The initial plan failed and Kitty was forced to phase her hand into Wolverine's brain. She then solidified her hand killing Wolverine instantly although she lost her hand in the process.
 In What if Magneto and Professor X Had Formed The X-Men Together, Kitty is the tech guru at the Good Shepard clinic (That reality's version of the X-Mansion). She is very similar to her mainstream counterpart. But unlike the mainstream version this Kitty Pryde would wear different coloured wigs and cut her natural hair short. She also had trouble with her powers since she would phase herself through a solid object and accidentally leave her clothes behind. She was also friends with Lockheed although she only called him Dragon.
 In What if Astonishing X-Men, Kitty is amongst the X-Men who fight a Phoenix powered Emma Frost. She phased Emma's heart from her chest but a Phoenix fire flares up from her body killing Kitty instantly. In the second story during the events of Astonishing X-Men #6-12 Elixir had not been able to heal Kitty after being impaled and she dies.
 In "What if the Dark Phoenix Rose Again", Kitty has Colossus "set up a fastball special" to help her phase into a Master Mold. She is killed after solidifying inside the Master Mold's head destroying it in the process.
 In What if Storm Had the Power of the Phoenix, Kitty helps revive the 'real' Storm (the Phoenix being the cosmic entity in Storm's shape) by phasing inside her body and getting her internal organs working again.

X-Babies
An X-Baby version of Shadowcat appears briefly in the X-Babies one-shot comic. She is wearing her original costume and is younger than the other X-Babies. She is named as Shadowkitty rather than Shadowcat or Kitty Pryde. She also doesn't seem to have a strong bond with the X-Baby version of Lockheed.

X-Men Forever
In the X-Men Forever series, Kitty and Nightcrawler have left Excalibur and rejoined the X-Men after the events of X-Men #1-3. Of the X-Men, she undergoes the most drastic changes from the events of X-Men Forever #1. During the battle with Fabian Cortez, she phases through Wolverine while he is being affected by Cortez's power. This drives her powers haywire as well, and somehow she ends up with one of Wolverine's claws in her wrist. Claremont has also hinted in dialogue throughout the title so far that she may have also undergone psychological or psychic changes as a result of the event. From Forever #4 to the current issue, she is shown to be able to use the claw in the exact method Wolverine would manifest it, with no apparent ill effects (the mechanism for this has not yet been made clear) outside of excruciating pain. Because of the merger with Logan's DNA she has begun to develop a healing factor, slower than Wolverine's but it heals faster when she is intangible. She has also slightly enhanced senses, she also can produce a set of five retractable claws on her left hand like Sabretooth. She has also begun to take on Logan's personality and memories as well. And because of this she is beginning to wonder what part of her truly remains the same.

X-Men: Misfits
In the X-Men: Misfits original English language manga one-shot graphic novel from Marvel and DelRay, Kitty is the newest and only female student of the all-male Xavier School for Gifted Youngsters, which is now experimenting with having a co-ed student body. As the sole girl, she becomes the center of attention and attraction for the rest of the students.  She becomes a member and the mascot of the elitist fraternity, The Hellfire Club, and has a short-lived romantic relationship with the school troublemaker Pyro.

X-Men: The End
In the X-Men: The End future, Kitty Pryde becomes the mayor of Chicago and then President of the United States. She has three children: her eldest daughter, named Meredith, and twins 10 years younger than Meredith, Sara and Doug, with an unnamed partner who died protecting her from an assassination attempt.

Miscellaneous
 In Excalibur #103, we see many alternative versions of Shadowcat. Many of these variations have appeared in other comics, such as Age of Apocalypse, but there were other variations, including one of her as a Phalanx convert, a sex dominatrix, a homeless person, a nun, a version wearing a costume similar to Phantom Girl, and a normal person who owns an Olde Curiosity Shoppe.
 In New Mutants #63 Illyana (Magik), along with Lockheed, gets trapped on an alien spaceship that has been invaded by a Brood Queen. On this ship the Brood Queen created clones of the X-Men, including Kitty. This one had the Ariel suit on, but it was green, instead of the typical blue. These X-Men are implanted with Brood eggs. Her memories were altered by the Brood Queen like the other X-Men, but eventually they rebel against her and are free. Illyana uses the soulsword to eliminate the Brood Eggs from their bodies. The X-Men stay on the ship; whether they are still on it is unknown.
During the Cross Time Caper storyline a few different appearances of Kitty appear. One was a princess who was gifted with magic abilities. She eventually married a short dashing prince (who had originally fallen in love with the mainstream version of Kitty). A second version was a crime boss who was betrayed and killed by her partner in crime Illiyana Rasputin. A third was from a world of sentient dinosaurs. She went by the name of Shadowcompsognathus.

Collected editions
Several of Kitty Pryde's earlier adventures were collected in paperback form.

In other media

Television
 Kitty Pryde appears in Spider-Man and His Amazing Friends. She appears as Sprite in the episode "The X-Men Adventure" and as Ariel in the episode "The Education of a Superhero".
 Kitty Pryde appears in X-Men: Pryde of the X-Men, voiced by Kath Soucie. This version is the newest member of the X-Men. Due to the pilot's failure, Pryde fell out of prominence in the comics and was replaced with Jubilee in X-Men: The Animated Series.
 Kitty Pryde as Shadowcat appears in X-Men: Evolution, voiced by Maggie Blue O'Hara. This version is a "teenybopper" and member of the X-Men who develops a relationship with Avalanche over the course of the series.
 Kitty Pryde as Shadowcat appears in Wolverine and the X-Men, voiced by Danielle Judovits. This version's design takes inspiration from her Astonishing X-Men appearance and was a student at the Xavier Institute before the X-Mansion was destroyed and Professor X and Jean Grey disappeared under mysterious circumstances. A year later, Pryde intended to travel to Genosha before Wolverine re-recruits her into the X-Men to avert a dystopian future controlled by Master Mold.
 Kitty Pryde as Shadowcat makes non-speaking appearances in The Super Hero Squad Show.

Film
 Kitty Pryde makes a cameo appearance in X-Men, portrayed by Sumela Kay.
 Kitty Pryde makes a cameo appearance in X2, portrayed by Katie Stuart. This version is roommates with Siryn, whose powers she is partially immune to.
 Kitty Pryde appears in X-Men: The Last Stand, portrayed by Elliot Page. She serves as a romantic rival to Rogue while competing for Bobby Drake's affections and joins the X-Men in protecting Leech from the Brotherhood of Mutants.
 Kitty Pryde appears in X-Men: Days of Future Past, portrayed again by Elliot Page. As of a dystopian future controlled by the Sentinels, she has developed the ability to send a person's consciousness into their past self, which she uses to help the surviving X-Men combat the Sentinels. She later uses this ability to send Logan's mind back in time to his past self in 1973 to avert the Sentinels' creation as his mind is the only one capable of surviving the mental rigors of the journey. In the "Rogue Cut" of the film, Rogue takes over for Pryde in keeping Wolverine's mind in the past after Pryde is injured. During the final battle, Pryde uses her powers to save Magneto from being killed by Sentinels. After Logan's mission succeeds and the timeline is successfully altered in both versions of the film, Pryde becomes a teacher at the Xavier Institute alongside Colossus.
 In January 2018, a Kitty Pryde solo film was announced to be in development at 20th Century Fox, with Tim Miller attached as the director and Brian Michael Bendis as the writer. However, following Disney's purchase of 21st Century Fox in March 2019, Fox executive Emma Watts described The New Mutants as the final film in the X-Men film series, which brought development on the Kitty Pryde film to an end.

Video games
 Kitty Pryde appears as a non-player character (NPC) in the X-Men arcade game. In the 2010 re-release, she is voiced by Mela Lee.
 Kitty Pryde as Shadowcat appears as a playable character in X-Men II: The Fall of the Mutants.
 Kitty Pryde as Shadowcat appears as an NPC in X-Men Legends II: Rise of Apocalypse, voiced by Kim Mai Guest.
 Kitty Pryde as Shadowcat appears in X-Men: The Official Game, voiced again by Kim Mai Guest.
 Kitty Pryde as Shadowcat appears as a playable character in Marvel Super Hero Squad Online, voiced by Tara Strong.
 Kitty Pryde appears as a playable character in Marvel: Avengers Alliance.
 Kitty Pryde appears as a playable character in the X-Men: Days of Future Past film tie-in game.
 Kitty Pryde appears as a playable character in Marvel Heroes, voiced again by Danielle Judovits.
 Kitty Pryde appears as a playable character in Marvel Future Fight.
 Kitty Pryde appears as a playable character in Marvel Puzzle Quest.
 Kitty Pryde appears as a playable character in Marvel Strike Force.

Miscellaneous
 Kitty Pryde is referenced in Weezer's song "In the Garage" from their "Blue Album".
 Kitty Pryde appears in Planet X.
 Kitty Pryde as Shadowcat appears in the Astonishing X-Men motion comic, initially voiced by Eileen Stevens and later by Laura Harris.

Notes

References

External links

 Kitty Pryde at Marvel.com
 UncannyXmen.net Spotlight on Shadowcat
 

Characters created by Chris Claremont
Characters created by John Byrne (comics)
Comics characters introduced in 1980
Excalibur (comics)
Female characters in animation
Female characters in film
Female characters in television
Fictional American Jews in comics
Fictional bisexual females
Fictional characters from Illinois
Fictional characters who can turn intangible
Fictional dancers
Fictional female ninja
Fictional Jewish women
Fictional linguists
Fictional mayors
Fictional schoolteachers
Fictional secret agents and spies
Fictional women soldiers and warriors
Jewish superheroes
Marvel Comics American superheroes
Marvel Comics child superheroes
Marvel Comics female superheroes
Marvel Comics film characters
Marvel Comics LGBT superheroes
Marvel Comics martial artists
Marvel Comics mutants
S.H.I.E.L.D. agents
Teenage characters in comics
X-Men members